Saint George's Church is an Anglican church located on Minden Road in Singapore's Tanglin Planning Area, off Holland Road.

Constructed between 1910 and 1913, the church was built for the British troops stationed in Tanglin Barracks which was once the General Headquarters of the British Far East Land Forces.

The church's community comprises members from Singapore and many other countries. They are bound by a common desire to follow Jesus Christ, and to seek God’s purpose for their lives.

Leadership

St. George's Church is owned by the Anglican Diocese of Singapore. The present vicar is Rev. Ian Hadfield. He is supported by Rev. Dr. Soh Guan Chin (Associate Priest) and Rev. Paul Tan (Auxiliary Priest).

The previous vicars of the church included Rev. Mark Roland Dickens, Rev. Canon Philip Sinden, Rev. Mervyn Moore (acting vicar), Rev. Loren Fox, Rev. Paul Corrie, Rev. John Benson, Bishop Dudley Foord (interim, vicar), Rev. Bruce Winter and Rev. Bob Robinson.

History
Origins of the Church building – Serving the British military in Singapore

St. George's Church was constructed from materials imported from England and cost £2,000 to build.

The land was formerly used as a nutmeg plantation and it included Mount Harriet, a 103-foot high hill on which the church now stands. The land belonged to William E. Willan and was sold in 1865. However, even before the church was built, an ordained minister for the garrison was appointed in 1871.

The current building dates back to 1910 but there was an earlier St. George's built in 1884 near the site of the present church. Both churches were built for the British troops quartered at Tanglin Barracks which was once the General Headquarters of the British Far East Land Forces. After the British forces withdrew from Singapore in 1968, the place was used by Singapore's Ministry of Defence as its headquarters before it moved to its new premises in Bukit Gombak

From Military to Civilian Church

St. George's became a civilian church after the British troops left Singapore in 1971. It was gazetted a national monument by the National Heritage Board of Singapore on 10 November 1978, and now serves a multinational Christian congregation in Singapore.

Major Ivan Lyon Memorial

On the outside of the church is a memorial tablet to Major Ivan Lyon D.S.O. M.B.E., who was killed on his second commando raid on military shipping in the Singapore Harbour in October 1944. At the time of the raid, Singapore was more than 1,000 miles inside Imperial Japanese-held territory.

Services
There are three regular services conducted on Sunday. All involve lay participation.
a more traditional Holy Communion service following the Anglican liturgy, with hymns from Common Praise
an informal service with a mix of modern songs and hymns, suitable for families; Holy Communion on the third Sunday of every month
an informal service; Holy Communion on the first Sunday of every month

The Filipino Fellowship meets at the Lower Hall every Sunday at 12pm while the Japanese Fellowship meets every Sunday at 2.30pm

Courses
A number of courses are run at St George's Church, including Alpha, Christianity Explored and Moore College theology courses.

Notable members
Tony Tan Keng Yam, the 7th President of Singapore.

See also

Anglicanism
Anglican Communion
Anglican Diocese of Singapore
Bishop of Singapore
Book of Common Prayer
Christianity in Singapore
Church of England
 Saint George: Devotions, traditions and prayers

References

Further reading 

 Anglican Theology, Chapman, Mark. Bloomsbury T&T Clark, (5 April 2012)
 Anglicanism: A Very Short Introduction, Chapman, Mark. Oxford University Press, 1st edition (15 July 2006)
 Anglicanism, Neill, Stephen. Oxford University Press, USA, 4th edition (12 October 1978)
Singapore's 100 Historic Places, National Heritage Board (2002), Archipelago Press, 
Singapore - A Guide to Buildings, Streets, Places, Norman Edwards, Peter Keys (1996), Times Books International, 
The Religious Monuments of Singapore, Lee Geok Boi (2002), Landmark Books,

News articles

External links
St George's Church – Official site
Saint George’s Church, Singapore www.YouTube.com
3D tour of Saint George’s Church, Singapore

Churches completed in 1913
20th-century Anglican church buildings
Churches in Singapore
Anglican church buildings in Singapore
Tourist attractions in Singapore
Landmarks in Singapore
National monuments of Singapore
Tanglin
1913 establishments in British Malaya
20th-century architecture in Singapore